Cecharismena jalapena is a species of moth in the family Erebidae.

The MONA or Hodges number for Cecharismena jalapena is 8532.1.

References

Further reading

 
 
 

Boletobiinae
Articles created by Qbugbot
Moths described in 1906